Maksim Olegovich Yedapin (born 3 April 2000) is a Russian football player. He plays for FC Tyumen.

Club career
On 19 February 2019, he joined FC Yenisey Krasnoyarsk on loan.

He made his debut in the Russian Premier League for FC Yenisey Krasnoyarsk on 26 May 2019 in a game against FC Zenit Saint Petersburg, as a 76th-minute substitute for David Yurchenko.

On 17 December 2019 he left CSKA upon the expiration of his contract.

References

External links
 
 

2000 births
Sportspeople from Barnaul
Living people
Russian footballers
Russia youth international footballers
Association football goalkeepers
FC Yenisey Krasnoyarsk players
PFC CSKA Moscow players
FC Tyumen players
FC Tekstilshchik Ivanovo players
Russian Premier League players
Russian First League players
Russian Second League players